Lanthanum carbonate, La(CO3)3, is the salt formed by lanthanum(III) cations and carbonate anions. It is an ore of lanthanum metal (bastnäsite), along with monazite.

Chemistry 
Lanthanum carbonate is used as a starting material in lanthanum chemistry, particularly in forming mixed oxides, for example
 for production of lanthanum strontium manganite, primarily for solid oxide fuel cell applications;
 for production of certain high-temperature superconductors, such as LaSrCuO.

Medical uses 
Lanthanum carbonate is used in medicine as a phosphate binder. As a medication it is sold under the trade name Fosrenol by the pharmaceutical company Shire Pharmaceuticals. Due to its large size (1000 mg tablet is 2.2 cm in diameter), it may be possible to choke on the tablet if it is not chewed. It is prescribed for the treatment of hyperphosphatemia, primarily in patients with chronic kidney disease. It is taken with meals and binds to dietary phosphate, preventing phosphate from being absorbed by the intestine. For cats with hyperphosphatemia it is available under the trade name Renalzin by Bayer Animal Health.

However, when lanthanum carbonate is used for treating hyperphosphatemia, its side effects, namely myalgia, muscular cramping, and peripheral edema, should be clinically monitored.

Other applications 
Lanthanum carbonate is also used for the tinting of glass, for water treatment, and as a catalyst for hydrocarbon cracking.

References

External links 
 Lanthanum - medlineplus.org
 Fosrenol.com - the manufacturer's web site
 Fosrenol - Drugs.com
 Fosrenol - Medscape.com
 PhosphorusControl.com - PhosphorusControl.com
 Bayer Animal Health

Nephrology procedures
Phosphate binders
Lanthanum compounds
Carbonates
Metal-containing drugs
Takeda Pharmaceutical Company brands